Floyd Franklin Bannister (born June 10, 1955) is an American former professional baseball left-handed pitcher, who played in Major League Baseball (MLB) for the Houston Astros (–), Seattle Mariners (–), Chicago White Sox (–), Kansas City Royals (–), California Angels, and Texas Rangers.

History
In 1973, as a high school senior, Bannister led his Kennedy High School team to a state championship, pitching 15 wins and 0 losses with a season ERA of 0.00. His performance led to him being selected in the third round (71st overall) of the 1973 Major League Baseball draft by the Oakland Athletics, but he did not sign.

Bannister went on to attend Arizona State University, where he was named college player of the year by The Sporting News as a junior. He was selected by the  Houston Astros as the first overall pick of the 1976 Major League Baseball draft, and signed with team, earning a $100,000 bonus.

He appeared in 24 games (23 starts), going 8–9 with a 4.04 earned run average (ERA). He spent one more season with the Astros before being traded to the Seattle Mariners in exchange for shortstop Craig Reynoldson December 8, 1978. He spent four years in Seattle, with his last year there being perhaps his best. Bannister finished the season 12–13 with a 3.43 ERA in 35 starts, and was selected to the All-Star Game for the first and only time in his career. He also led the American League with 209 strikeouts, a career best. In 1983 and 1985, he led the American League in strikeouts per nine innings with averages of 8.0 and 8.5, respectively.

On December 13, 1982, Bannister signed a five-year contract with the Chicago White Sox as a free agent. During his time in Chicago, he was a solid starting pitcher, averaging 13 wins each year. In his first season with the White Sox, Bannister went 16–10 with a career-low 3.35 ERA in 34 starts, helping the team earn a playoff spot. He also tossed a career-high 11 complete games in 1987, his last season with the White Sox. 

On December 10, 1987, Bannister and infielder Dave Cochrane were traded to the Kansas City Royals in exchange for pitchers John Davis, Mélido Pérez, Chuck Mount and Greg Hibbard. However, in June , he suffered an injury which knocked him out for the rest of the year. In nine starts for the Swallows, he went 3–2 with a 4.04 ERA.

On December 13, 1990, Bannister signed a minor league contract with the California Angels, where he was converted into a reliever. He recorded a 3.96 ERA in 16 relief appearances with the Angels before being released on August 29.

Armed with a strong fastball, an excellent slider, and above average curveball, Bannister recorded an average of 6.49 strikeouts per nine innings in his career, but was also shuffled between six different teams in his 15-year career. He gave up more than 30 home runs in four different seasons and was followed by criticism for a reluctance to move hitters off the plate by pitching inside.

In a 15-year major league career, Bannister compiled a 134–143 record, with a 4.06 ERA in 431 games (363 starts). He had 62 complete games in his career, along with 16 shutouts. He amassed 1,723 strikeouts over his career, averaging 147 a year.

His son, Brian Bannister, pitched for five seasons for the New York Mets and the Kansas City Royals. Floyd ("Flo B") now manages Brian's professional photography studio in Phoenix.

See also
 List of Major League Baseball annual strikeout leaders

References

Floyd Bannister - Baseballbiography.com
"...Floyd Bannister Named To National College Baseball Hall of Fame Class of 2008" link

External links

Major League Baseball pitchers
Baseball players from South Dakota
Houston Astros players
Seattle Mariners players
Chicago White Sox players
Kansas City Royals players
California Angels players
Texas Rangers players
American League All-Stars
American League strikeout champions
Arizona State Sun Devils baseball players
American expatriate baseball players in Japan
Yakult Swallows players
Covington Astros players
Memphis Blues players
Columbus Astros players
Palm Springs Angels players
1955 births
Living people
People from Pierre, South Dakota
National College Baseball Hall of Fame inductees
All-American college baseball players
Alaska Goldpanners of Fairbanks players